Finneran is an Irish surname that may refer to:

Finneran (1876–1961), American baseball umpire
Brian Finneran (born 1976), American football player
Gary Finneran (American football) (born 1934), American football player
Gary Finneran (1964–2009), American singer-songwriter, frontman for the band Ex-Idols
Happy Finneran (1890–1942), American baseball player
Kathleen Finneran (born 1957), American author
Katie Finneran (born 1971), American film, stage and television actress
Kevin Finneran, American lacrosse player and coach
Michael Finneran (born 1947), Irish footballer and politician
Mike Finneran (born 1948), American diver
Ron Finneran (born 1944), Australian Paralympic athlete and sports administrator
Sharon Finneran (born 1946), American swimmer
Siobhan Finneran (born 1966), British actress
Thomas Finneran (born 1950), American radio talk host and politician

Surnames of Irish origin